The following is an alphabetical list of topics related to the Republic of Paraguay.

0–9

.py – Internet country code top-level domain for Paraguay

A
Air Force of Paraguay
Americas
South America
landlocked country
Army of Paraguay
Asunción (Nuestra Señora Santa María de la Asunción) – Capital of Paraguay
Atlas of Paraguay

B

Brasiguayos

C
Capital of Paraguay:  Nuestra Señora Santa María de la Asunción (Asunción)

Categories:
:Category:Paraguay
:Category:Buildings and structures in Paraguay
:Category:Communications in Paraguay
:Category:Economy of Paraguay
:Category:Education in Paraguay
:Category:Environment of Paraguay
:Category:Geography of Paraguay
:Category:Government of Paraguay
:Category:Health in Paraguay
:Category:History of Paraguay
:Category:Images of Paraguay
:Category:Law of Paraguay
:Category:Military of Paraguay
:Category:Paraguay stubs
:Category:Paraguayan culture
:Category:Paraguayan people
:Category:Paraguay-related lists
:Category:Politics of Paraguay
:Category:Society of Paraguay
:Category:Sport in Paraguay
:Category:Transportation in Paraguay
commons:Category:Paraguay
Cinema of Paraguay
Climate of Paraguay
Coat of arms of Paraguay
Communications in Paraguay
Crime in Paraguay
Cuisine of Paraguay
Culture of Paraguay

D
Demographics of Paraguay
Diplomatic missions of Paraguay
Districts of Paraguay

E
Economy of Paraguay
Education in Paraguay
Elections in Paraguay

F
Foreign relations of Paraguay

G
Geography of Paraguay
Government of Paraguay
Guaraní Aquifer

H
Health care in Paraguay
Hinduism in Paraguay
History of Paraguay
Human rights in Paraguay
Humaitá class gunboat

I
International Organization for Standardization (ISO)
ISO 3166-1 alpha-2 country code for Paraguay: PY
ISO 3166-1 alpha-3 country code for Paraguay: PRY
ISO 3166-2:PY region codes for Paraguay
Internet in Paraguay
Islam in Paraguay

J

Jesuit Reductions

L
Landlocked country
Latin America
Lists related to Paraguay:
Diplomatic missions of Paraguay
List of airports in Paraguay
List of birds of Paraguay
List of cities in Paraguay
List of countries by GDP (nominal)
List of diplomatic missions in Paraguay
List of football clubs in Paraguay
List of high schools in Paraguay
List of Paraguay-related topics
List of political parties in Paraguay
List of wars involving Paraguay
List of World Heritage Sites in Paraguay
Topic outline of Paraguay

M
Media in Paraguay
Military of Paraguay
Military Ranks of Paraguay
Mining in Paraguay
Music of Paraguay

N
Nuestra Señora Santa María de la Asunción (Asunción) – Capital of Paraguay

P
Paraguay
Paraguay at the Olympics
Politics of Paraguay
President of Paraguay
Prostitution in Paraguay
Public holidays in Paraguay

R
Rail transport in Paraguay
Reductions of Paraguay
Religion in Paraguay
Republic of Paraguay (República del Paraguay)

S
Scouting in Paraguay
Senate of Paraguay
South America
South Temperate Zone and Tropics
Southern Cone
Southern Hemisphere
Spanish colonization of the Americas
Spanish language

T
ARP Tacuary
Topic outline of Paraguay
Transport in Paraguay
Tropic of Capricorn
Tropics and South Temperate Zone

U
United Nations founding member state 1945
United States-Paraguay relations

W
Water supply and sanitation in Paraguay
Western Hemisphere

Wikipedia:WikiProject Topic outline/Drafts/Topic outline of Paraguay

See also

List of international rankings
Lists of country-related topics
Topic outline of geography
Topic outline of Paraguay
Topic outline of South America
United Nations

External links

 
Paraguay